Matthäus is a given name or surname. Notable people with the name include:

Surname
 Lothar Matthäus, (born 1961), German former football player and manager

Given name
 Matthäus Aurogallus, Professor of Hebrew at the University of Wittenberg
 Matthäus Dresser, German humanist and historian
 Matthäus Daniel Pöppelmann, German master builder who helped to rebuild Dresden after the fire of 1685
 Matthäus Lang von Wellenburg, German statesman and archbishop of Salzburg
 Matthäus Merian, Swiss engraver

See also
 Matthias
 Matthew (name)
 St Matthew Passion by Bach